St. Aubyn Hines (born March 21, 1972) is a retired boxer from Jamaica, who competed for his native country at the 1992 Summer Olympics in Barcelona, Spain.

He competed in the Men's Light-Flyweight (– 48 kg) division. At the 1992 Games he was defeated in the first round by Thailand's Phamuansak Phasuwan after the referee stopped the contest in the second round. He also represented Jamaica at the 1994 Commonwealth Games.

References

 Profile

1972 births
Living people
Flyweight boxers
Boxers at the 1992 Summer Olympics
Olympic boxers of Jamaica
Boxers at the 1994 Commonwealth Games
Commonwealth Games competitors for Jamaica
Competitors at the 1993 Central American and Caribbean Games
Jamaican male boxers